is a railway station in Minato, Tokyo, Japan. It serves as an interchange for the Toei Ōedo Line (E-19) and Yurikamome (U-02).

Line
Yurikamome
Toei Ōedo Line

Station layout
Both parts of the station are not directly linked to one another.

Toei
The Toei part of the station has an underground island platform with two tracks on either side.

Yurikamome
The Yurikamome uses an elevated island platform with two tracks on either side.

History
Although the structures of both the Yurikamome and Toei stations were completed on 1 November 1995 and 12 December 2000, they were not opened yet as the surrounding area was undergoing redevelopment. It was only on 2 November 2002 when both stations opened.

See also

 List of railway stations in Japan

References

External links

Shiodome Station information (Yurikamome)

Railway stations in Japan opened in 2002
Yurikamome
Toei Ōedo Line
Railway stations in Tokyo
Shiodome
Buildings and structures in Minato, Tokyo